Shabagish (Şäbağış) is a rural locality (a village) in Shabagishsky Selsoviet, Kuyurgazinsky District, Bashkortostan, Russia. The population was 581 as of 2010. There are 4 streets.

Geography 
Shabagish is located 9 km northwest of Yermolayevo (the district's administrative centre) by road. Mayachny is the nearest rural locality.

References 

Rural localities in Kuyurgazinsky District